Thunder on the Hill is a 1951 American film noir crime film directed by Douglas Sirk and starring Claudette Colbert and Ann Blyth. The picture was made by Universal-International Pictures and produced by Michael Kraike from a screenplay by Oscar Saul and Andrew Solt, based on the play Bonaventure by Charlotte Hastings. The music score was by Hans J. Salter and the cinematography by William H. Daniels.

Thunder on the Hill was first announced as a Universal-International Pictures project in August 1947, with plans for Robert Siodmak to direct, Joseph Sistrom to produce and with Joan Fontaine and Burt Lancaster starring. The production for Thunder on the Hill was postponed to allow Lancaster to film All My Sons, and while Fontaine filmed Letter from an Unknown Woman, her first movie through her own film production company Rampart Productions (co-owned with her husband William Dozier). Thunder on the Hill was postponed again, to the autumn of 1948, this time to allow for the filming of Kiss the Blood Off My Hands, starring both Fontaine and Lancaster, which was to be immediately followed by Rampart Productions' second film, You Gotta Stay Happy (co-starring Fontaine and James Stewart). Due to Fontaine's announced pregnancy during the filming of Kiss the Blood Off My Hands, the filming of Thunder on the Hill was again pushed back, this time to January 1949; by then the entire production team and its stars had been replaced.

Plot

Sister Mary Bonaventure is in charge of the hospital ward of a convent in the county of Norfolk, England. She is troubled by her own sister's suicide, which she confides to her Mother Superior.

A torrential rain closes nearby roads, causing Sergeant Melling of the police to bring condemned murderer Valerie Carns there. She is being taken to prison.

Valerie was convicted of poisoning her brother Jason, a pianist. Jason's physician, Dr. Jeffreys, is head of the hospital where Sister Mary now works. Valerie still proclaims her innocence, but Jeffreys insists that she gave Jason a fatal overdose of his medicine.

A photograph of Jason clearly disturbs Isabel Jeffreys, the doctor's wife. He gives her a sedative. Valerie appeals to Sister Mary to bring her fiancé, Sidney Kingham, to the convent to see her. A servant tells Sister Mary about the sadistic behaviour of Jason Carns and produces a love letter to him, clearly written by Isabel.

Mother Superior is upset by Sister Mary's meddling. She burns the letter. The nun still intends to tell Melling the police sergeant what she knows.

Dr. Jeffreys is the one who gave Jason the fatal dose, and he might be slowly poisoning Isabel as well. He lures Sister Mary to a bell tower, where he attacks her. She rings the bell. Sidney hears it, rushes to her aid and overpowers Jeffreys, who is arrested by Melling.

Sister Mary's faith is restored, believing the rain that delivered Valerie to her to be divine intervention.

Cast

 Claudette Colbert as Sister Mary 
 Ann Blyth as Valerie Carns 
 Robert Douglas as Dr. Jeffreys 
 Anne Crawford as Isabel Jeffreys 
 Philip Friend as Sidney Kingham 
 Gladys Cooper as Mother Superior 
 Michael Pate as Willie 
 John Abbott as Abel Harmer 
 Connie Gilchrist as Sister Josephine 
 Gavin Muir as Melling 
 Phyllis Stanley as Nurse Phillips 
 Norma Varden as Pierce 
 Valerie Cardew as Nurse Colby 
 Queenie Leonard as Mrs. Smithson 
 Patrick O'Moore as Mr. Smithson

Home releases
The film was released on a Region A Blu-ray in North America by Kino Lorber as part of their Film Noir: The Dark Side of Cinema II box set.

References

External links

 
 
 
 

1951 films
Film noir
1951 crime drama films
American black-and-white films
American films based on plays
Films directed by Douglas Sirk
American mystery films
Universal Pictures films
Films set in Norfolk
American crime drama films
Films scored by Hans J. Salter
1950s English-language films
1950s American films